Lawrence Winslow Pleau (born January 29, 1947) is an American former ice hockey player who is currently the senior advisor to the general manager for the Arizona Coyotes of the National Hockey League (NHL). He formerly served as senior vice president and General Manager of the St. Louis Blues. He played in the NHL with the Montreal Canadiens between 1970 and 1972, and in the World Hockey Association with the New England Whalers between 1972 and 1979. Internationally Pleau played for the American national team at the 1968 Winter Olympics and the 1969 World Championship.

High school and junior career
Larry Pleau played for Lynn English High School Bulldogs in Lynn, Massachusetts from 1963 to 1964 before moving to Canada where he spent the next three seasons with the Montreal Junior Canadiens of the Ontario Hockey League from 1964 to 1967.

Professional career
Pleau was one of the top American hockey players in the late 1960s and early 1970s, playing for the United States team at the 1968 Winter Olympics in Grenoble as well as the 1969 Ice Hockey World Championship tournament in Stockholm.

He spent the 1968–69 season with the Jersey Devils of the Eastern Hockey League, becoming the league's rookie of the year.

He then played three seasons for the Montreal Canadiens from 1970-1972. He was included on the team's championship photo and has a Stanley Cup ring, but did not play enough games to have his name engraved on the Stanley Cup. After being selected off waivers by the Toronto Maple Leafs in the summer of 1972, he instead choose to sign a contract with his hometown New England Whalers of the upstart World Hockey Association (WHA). Pleau became one of the Whalers' early stars and appeared in the 1973, 1974 and 1975 WHA All Star Game as the Whalers representative. He was also a member of the United States team at the inaugural 1976 Canada Cup, although he did not appear in the tournament itself. He played seven seasons for the Whalers before retiring in 1979.

Coaching career
He was the head coach of the Hartford Whalers from 1980-1983. He then coached the Binghamton Whalers of the American Hockey League from 1984–1988. He was re-hired by Hartford in 1987 and coached them until 1989.

Front office career
Pleau joined the New York Rangers as assistant general manager of player development in 1989, and was later promoted to assistant general manager and director of player personnel. He stayed with the Rangers for eight years, including the Rangers' Cup-winning season in 1993–94.

He moved to the Blues in 1997 as general manager. The Rangers received winger Mike Peluso from the Blues as compensation. While Pleau presided over the Blues' winning the Presidents' Trophy in 1999–2000, the Blues steadily declined over the next few seasons, culminating in finishing dead last in the league in 2005–06, missing the playoffs for the first time in 25 years and for only the fourth time in franchise history. Following the season, the Blues were sold to Dave Checketts. Pleau kept his job as general manager, but had to give most of his powers over hockey operations to John Davidson.

Pleau was also assistant general manager of the silver medal-winning American hockey team at the 2002 Winter Olympics, and was general manager of Team USA during the 2003 and 2004 IIHF World Championships and the 2004 World Cup of Hockey.

Pleau stepped down as general manager of the St Louis Blues on July 1, 2010, with Doug Armstrong taking his place. Pleau was then named senior advisor to hockey operations, and vice president, with the Blues after 13 years as the club's general manager, the longest tenure in franchise history.

Awards and achievements

Eastern Hockey League Rookie of the Year (1969)
1971  Stanley Cup championship  (Montreal)
Played in the 1973, 1974 and 1975 WHA All Star Game
1987  Louis A.R. Pieri Memorial Award winner - Coach of the year (Binghamton) AHL
1994  Stanley Cup championship  (NYR) as Assistant General Manager
 United States Hockey Hall of Fame, 2000
 Lester Patrick Award, 2002

Career statistics

Regular season and playoffs

International

NHL coaching record

References

External links

1947 births
Living people
American men's ice hockey centers
American ice hockey coaches
Hartford Whalers coaches
Hartford Whalers executives
Ice hockey coaches from Massachusetts
Ice hockey people from Massachusetts
Ice hockey players from Massachusetts
Ice hockey players at the 1968 Winter Olympics
Jersey Devils players
Lester Patrick Trophy recipients
Montreal Canadiens players
National Hockey League executives
National Hockey League general managers
New England Whalers players
New York Rangers executives
Olympic ice hockey players of the United States
St. Louis Blues executives
Sportspeople from Lynn, Massachusetts
Springfield Indians players
Stanley Cup champions
United States Hockey Hall of Fame inductees
World Hockey Association broadcasters